Sulów  is a village in the administrative district of Gmina Zakrzówek, within Kraśnik County, Lublin Voivodeship, in eastern Poland.

References

External links
 Sulów Parish Homepage

Villages in Kraśnik County